Bonnemaisoniaceae is a family of red algae in the order Bonnemaisoniales.

References

External links 
 

Red algae families